The Rivista di Matematica della Università di Parma (The Mathematical Revue of the University of Parma) is a peer-reviewed mathematics journal published by the Department of Mathematics and Computer Science of the University of Parma, established in 1950. It is devoted to publication of original research and survey papers in all areas of pure and applied mathematics: it also publishes workshops and conferences proceedings, following the tradition behind its foundation.

The journal is abstracted and indexed by Scopus, Mathematical Reviews and Zentralblatt MATH.

Historical notice

Foundation
The journal was founded by Antonio Mambriani in 1950, with the aim to publish the proceedings of the mathematical congress "Analisi funzionale e equazioni differenziali", held in Parma on June 4, 1949. Among the participants there were Renato Caccioppoli, Gianfranco Cimmino, Luigi Fantappiè, Carlo Miranda, Giovanni Sansone, Francesco Severi and Giuseppe Zwirner: all their contributions, except the one of Caccioppoli, were published in the first volume of the Journal, released in the month of December 1950. Caccioppoli's conference, despite a help request sent by Mambriani to Carlo Miranda and the submitting of a shorthand draft to Caccioppoli through Miranda with praise to review and correct it for the publication, remained unpublished until 1999. Along with Mambriani, another person who was in the editorial board of the journal since 1950 was Bianca Manfredi. She cured the scientific aspect of the published papers and their formal appearance up to the least details and, after working at the journal for 25 years along with Mambriani, she served as its director for 17 years, from 1975 to 1991, showing considerable management skills.

Timeline of journal series and editors in chief
At present, eight series of the "Rivista" have been published, each one corresponding approximately to the duration of the period of charge of a given editor in chief. The full list of published series and editors in chief is tabulated below:

Structure
The current by-laws of the journal define its structure: in its present form, it states that the journal is directed by three controlling bodies, i.e. the editor in chief, the redaction committee or "Editorial Board", and the redaction secretariat:

The editor in chief is appointed by the rector of the University of Parma on a proposal of the Board of the Department of Mathematics and Computer Science of the University of Parma, and shall remain in office for four years: the candidate should be a university professor of the department itself, in office or retired.

The Editorial Board should be composed of four university mathematics professors, in office or retired, appointed by the rector on a proposal of the editor in chief and on the advice of Board of the Department of Mathematics and Computer Science: they remain in office for four years and, despite its formal expiry when a new editor in chief is appointed, they should continue to perform their duties until a new Editorial Board is appointed.

The editor in chief may seek the collaboration of an advisory board: if he chose to do so, he should appoint leading mathematicians in specific fields of research, on proposals of the editorial board. On its part, the appointed Advisory Board supports the scientific activity of the journal and does not perform any administrative duty.

See also
 Rendiconti del Seminario Matematico della Università di Padova
 Rendiconti del Seminario Matematico Università e Politecnico di Torino
 Rendiconti di Matematica e delle sue Applicazioni

Notes

References
.  (with a contribution of G. Prodi) is the critical analysis of a conference held by Caccioppoli himself and related letters by Carlo Miranda, Giovanni Prodi and Francesco Severi.
. A copy of the official request of inclusion in the Press Registry of the newborn journal by its founder.
.
.
.
.
.
.
.
.

External links
 

Academic journals published by universities and colleges
Biannual journals
Delayed open access journals
English-language journals
Mathematics journals
Publications established in 1950